Dites au prince charmant is a 2006 album by Belgian singer Lio. It features songs written by Serge Gainsbourg, her sister Héléna Noguerra as well as longtime collaborators Jacques Duvall and Jay Alanski.

Track listing

Personnel
 Drums, percussion – Jens Jansson
 Mastered by – Chab
 Piano, organ [electric] – Erik Hjarpe
 Backing vocals – Doriand
 Recorded by, background vocals, guitar – Peter Von Poehl
 Recorded by, mixed by, bass, flute, saxophone, arranged by [strings], instruments [additional] – Christoffer Lundquist
 Violin – Thomas Ebrelius

Charts

References

2006 albums
Lio albums